St. Hedwig Parish is designated for Polish immigrants in Cambridge, Massachusetts, United States. Founded in 1907, it was one of the Polish-American Roman Catholic parishes in New England in the Archdiocese of Boston.

The last pastor of the parish, from 1964, was Monsignor Francis Chmaj. The parish closed on June 15, 1995, though the closing mass was on April 23, 1995.

After World War II, the parish was a place that brought together the Polish Armed Forces officers settled in the Boston area.

Bibliography 
 Our Lady of Czestochowa Parish - Centennial 1893–1993
 The Official Catholic Directory in USA

External links 
 Roman Catholic Archdiocese of Boston
 Closed and Merged Parishes
 St. Hedwig - ParishesOnline.com

Roman Catholic parishes of Archdiocese of Boston
Polish-American Roman Catholic parishes in Massachusetts